Del Sol Academy of the Performing Arts, commonly known as Del Sol High School, is a nine-month public high school in Las Vegas, Nevada and is part of the Clark County School District. Del Sol was one of three schools (including Canyon Springs and Spring Valley) to open in Fall 2004. In 2016, Del Sol High School was reestablished as a performing arts academy focusing on band, costume design, dance, mariachi, music production, orchestra, theater, theater tech and vocal performance. Del Sol’s first State Title in Athletics was by the Boys Bowling team in 2018.

Performing Arts Academy

Orchestra 
Del Sol Academy's orchestra is taught by Marla Huizar and Ryan Villahermosa. The orchestra received a superior rating at festival in 2021. https://delsolacademyorchestra.com/

Band 
Known as the "Dragon's Fire Band," the school received third place in the 2015 Henderson Winterfest parade.

Costume Design 
Del Sol Academy offers the only magnet-school concentration area focusing on costume design in the state. Five students were finalists in the Fashion Forward Design Competition in 2017.

Theater Tech 
The school's theater technology program earned third place in the "Tech Olympics," a competition sponsored by Nevada Thespians.

Extracurricular activities 

 Del Sol's dance team was awarded first place honors at the Southern Utah University Shakespearean Festival.
 The school's Symphonic Band and Orchestra received all superior ratings in 2007.
 Del Sol holds an annual multicultural "extravaganza" highlighting the ethnic diversity of its students.
 In 2007, Del Sol's DECA club qualified seven of its members for an international DECA competition held in Orlando, Florida. In 2008, four members qualified for the competition held in Atlanta, Georgia.
 In 2012, Del Sol won the Flip the Script contest, a challenge issued by R&R Partners to end bullying in schools.
 In the 2012–2013 school year, Del Sol's drumline was awarded "Drumline of the Year" by Las Vegas radio station KLUC (98.5 FM).

Athletics

Football 
The Del Sol Dragons compete in the Southeast Division of the Sunrise 4A Region. The football team won the Southeast Division title in 2006 and has made it to the state semifinals in both of the previous two seasons. During the 2009–2010 season, Del Sol reached the state finals for football, although it lost to Bishop Gorman High School in the final game. Head football coach Preston Goroff resigned in that position to become the dean in 2013. Goroff's tenure as coach lasted ten years and culminated in one state championship appearance.

Wrestling 
The wrestling program has producing two state placers—Chris Dunfield (twice all region, once all state, and second place in 2006) and Ashton Hill (twice all region, once all-state, and fourth in the 2007 state tournament). In 2006, the team placed eighth in the sunrise region. During the 2015–2016 school year, the wrestling team had one student become the state champion. In 2007, the women's tennis team reached the Nevada State Semi-Finals, losing to Bishop Gorman.

Sunrise 4A Regional titles 

Football: 2009

Sunrise 4A Region Southeast Division titles 

Football: 2006, 2008*, 2009

* - shared title

Notable alumni

 Evan Weinstock (born 1991), Olympic bobsledder

Feeder schools
Jack Dailey Elementary School
Gene Ward Elementary School
Doris French Elementary School
Lewis E. Rowe Elementary School
Bill Y. Tomiyasu Elementary School
Harley A. Harmon Elementary School
Jim Thorpe Elementary School
Nate Mack Elementary School
David M. Cox Elementary School
Louis Weiner Elementary School
Charlotte Hill Elementary School
Helen C. Cannon Junior High School
William E. Orr Middle School
C W Woodbury Middle School
Jack L. Schofield Middle School
Francis H. Cortney Junior High School
Thurman White Middle School
Barbara & Hank Greenspun Junior High School

References

External links 
 

Clark County School District
Educational institutions established in 2004
High schools in Clark County, Nevada
School buildings completed in 2004
2004 establishments in Nevada
Public high schools in Nevada